Sebastien de Castell is a Canadian fantasy writer, mostly known for his Greatcoat series that has been described as "Three Musketeers meets high fantasy", and which got him nominated several science fiction and fantasy awards, such as the Astounding Award for Best New Writer and the David Gemmell Awards for Fantasy. His next series Spellslinger would see him nominated for Grand prix de l'Imaginaire and the Sunburst Award, as well as the winner of the Elbakin.net Award. De Castell has stated his interest in writing "optimistic but flawed heroes", saying that it was the type of heroes he enjoyed reading about as a kid, but placed "in an environment that had some of the depth and darkness".

Both the Greatcoats and Spellslinger series are set in the same world, as are their follow on series "The Court Of Shadows" and "Argosi" series.

De Castell has at various time worked as a full-time musician, an interaction designer, teacher, project manager, fight choreographer, actor and more.  Before publishing his first novel, de Castell worked at the Vancouver Film School.

Bibliography

Novels

Short Stories 

 Firewood (a Spellslinger short story)
 The Fox and the Bowman (2018)
 The Kings Letters (2018) (a Greatcoats short story)
 The Dowager Magus (2018) (a Spellslinger short story)
 The Sword Of Seven Tears (2021) (a Greatcoat short story)
 The Red Lily (2021) (a Spellslinger short story)
 The Obsidian Worm (2021) (a Spellslinger short story)
 Six-String Demon (2021)
 Tales Of The Greatcoats (2021) (a collection of Greatcoats short stories, some previously published by Dashing Blades)
 Death Of the Swashbuckler
 A Study In Steel
 Dance Of The Chamberlain
 Grave Of Thorns
 Memories Of Flame
 The Assassin's Heresy
 The Wheelwright's Duel
 Duel With The Demon
 When The Sword Seems To Smile
 Collision (2022)
 Mister Farnsworth Versus the Alien Demons of Ancient Egypt (2022)

Awards

Won 
 Elbakin.net, Best translated fantasy YA, Winner 2018 (Spellslinger)

Nominated 
 Goodreads Choice Award, Semi-Finalist 2014 (Traitor's Blade)
 David Gemmell Awards for Fantasy, Morningstar Award for Best Debut, Finalist 2015 
 Astounding Award for Best New Writer, Finalist 2016 
 Prix_Imaginales, Foreign translation, Finalist 2016 (Traitor's Blade)
 Grand prix de l'Imaginaire, Best Foreign Young Adult, Finalist 2019 (Spellslinger, Shadowblack)
 Sunburst Award, Young Adult Award, Finalist 2019 (Spellslinger)

References

External links 

21st-century Canadian novelists
Canadian fantasy writers
Living people
Year of birth missing (living people)